John Michael Saint (born 31 January 1969 in Auburn, New South Wales), is an Australian cricket player, who played for the Tasmanian Tigers from the 1995–96 season, until the 1997–98 season.

See also
 List of Tasmanian representative cricketers

External links
Cricinfo Profile

1969 births
Living people
Australian cricketers
Tasmania cricketers
Cricketers from Sydney